Xu Demei (born May 23, 1967 in Zhejiang) is a former track and field athlete from PR China, who competed for her native country in the women's javelin throw event at the 1992 Summer Olympics in Barcelona, Spain. Her biggest success was winning the world title in 1991, a week after China's first ever gold medal at the World Championships in Athletics by shot putter Huang Zhihong.

She was also Asian champion at the 1991 Asian Athletics Championships and won silver medals at the 1989 Asian Athletics Championships and 1990 Asian Games. She was fourth at the 1992 IAAF World Cup.

International competitions

See also
China at the World Championships in Athletics

References
 

1967 births
Living people
Athletes from Zhejiang
Chinese female javelin throwers
Olympic athletes of China
Athletes (track and field) at the 1992 Summer Olympics
Asian Games medalists in athletics (track and field)
Athletes (track and field) at the 1990 Asian Games
World Athletics Championships athletes for China
World Athletics Championships medalists
Asian Games silver medalists for China
Medalists at the 1990 Asian Games
World Athletics Championships winners
20th-century Chinese women